John Philip Bagwell DL (11 August 1874 – 22 August 1946) was an Irish businessman and politician.

Early life and family
Bagwell was born on 11 August 1874, the son of Harriet (née Newton) and Richard Bagwell. The Bagwells of Marlfield could trace their arrival in Ireland to John Bagwell (Backwell), a captain in Cromwell's New Model Army. 

Bagwell married Louisa Shaw, the daughter of George Shaw, a Major General. He was commissioned a second lieutenant in the 4th (Militia) Battalion of The Royal Irish Regiment on 7 March 1900, and promoted to lieutenant on 28 July 1900.

Business
Bagwell was general manager of Ireland's Great Northern Railways (GNR) between 1911 and 1926.

Politics
Bagwell became an independent member of Seanad Éireann in the Irish Free State in 1922, and held that office until 1936. 

During the Irish Civil War he was kidnapped from near his house in Howth and held hostage by anti-Treaty forces in the Dublin Mountains. The Free State government responded by issuing a proclamation to the effect that if Bagwell were not safely released, reprisals would be taken. 

Bagwell, however, maintained that he escaped his captors through his own efforts and his safe release could not be attributed to these threats. At around the same time, the family residence at Marlfield House, Clonmel, County Tipperary, was burned by Anti-treaty forces and the library of rare historical documents destroyed.

References

1874 births
1946 deaths
Independent members of Seanad Éireann
Members of the 1922 Seanad
Members of the 1925 Seanad
Members of the 1928 Seanad
Members of the 1931 Seanad
Members of the 1934 Seanad
John Philip
Deputy Lieutenants in Ireland
People of the Irish Civil War (Pro-Treaty side)
Politicians from County Tipperary
Irish people in rail transport
People from Howth